Michael Thomas McCaul Sr. (born January 14, 1962) is an American attorney and politician serving as the U.S. representative for  since 2005. A member of the Republican Party, he chaired the House Committee on Homeland Security during the 113th, 114th, and 115th Congresses. His district stretches from Austin to Houston.

McCaul became the Chair of the House Foreign Affairs Committee in the 118th Congress in 2023.

Early life, education and legal career
Born in Dallas, the son of Frances Jane (Lott) and James Addington McCaul, Jr., McCaul has English, Irish, and German ancestry. He graduated from Jesuit College Preparatory School of Dallas and earned a Bachelor of Arts in history from San Antonio's Trinity University in 1984 and a Juris Doctor from St. Mary's University three years later. McCaul also completed a Senior Executive Fellowship at Harvard Kennedy School.

McCaul worked as an attorney and federal prosecutor before entering politics. He was the Chief of Counterterrorism and National Security for Texas's branch of the US Attorney's office, and also worked under the Department of Justice's Public Integrity Section. After he left, McCaul took a position as a Deputy Attorney General in 1999 with the Texas Attorney General's Office and served in this capacity until 2002.

U.S. House of Representatives

Elections
McCaul first ran for the U.S. House of Representatives in 2004 and won a crowded Republican primary in the newly created 10th District. The district, which included part of Austin, the western part of Harris County and several rural counties in between, was thought to be so heavily Republican that no Democratic candidate even filed, effectively handing him the seat.

In 2006 he defeated Democratic nominee Ted Ankrum and former Libertarian presidential candidate Michael Badnarik with 55% of the vote. McCaul was reelected again in 2008, against Democratic candidate Larry Joe Doherty and Libertarian candidate Matt Finkel, 54% to 43%.

Four years later, he was reelected to a fourth term with 76% of the vote against Ankrum (22%) and Libertarian candidate Jeremiah "JP" Perkins (1%). McCaul won a seventh term in 2016 with 179,221 votes (57.3%) to  Democratic nominee Tawana W. Cadien's 120,170 (38.4%). Libertarian Bill Kelsey received 13,209 (4.2%).

In 2018, McCaul won an eighth term in the House with 157,166 votes (51.1%) to Democratic nominee Mike Siegel's 144,034 (46.8%) and Libertarian Mike Ryan's 6,627 votes (2.5%). It was the closest race of McCaul's career.

He was elected to a ninth term in 2020, defeating Siegel again.

Political positions

Cybersecurity

On December 11, 2013, McCaul introduced legislation to require the Secretary of the Department of Homeland Security (DHS) to conduct cybersecurity activities on behalf of the federal government and codify DHS's role in preventing and responding to cybersecurity incidents involving the Information Technology (IT) systems of federal civilian agencies and critical infrastructure in the U.S. McCaul said the bill was "an important step toward addressing the cyber threat."

Donald Trump
On December 18, 2019, McCaul voted against both articles of impeachment against President Donald Trump. Of the 195 Republicans who voted, all voted against both impeachment articles.

Foreign affairs
McCaul is Chairman of the House Foreign Affairs Committee.

In April 2019, McCaul spoke out against a resolution that would end U.S. involvement in the Yemeni Civil War, saying it would "disrupt US security cooperation agreements with more than 100 countries."

In 2021, McCaul strongly supported President Joe Biden's airstrikes on Iranian targets in Syria.

McCaul said he supports heavily arming Ukraine with the weapons they need to win the Russo-Ukrainian War. He believes the United States should send fighter jets and more missiles to Ukraine. In February 2023, McCaul met the President of Ukraine in Kyiv and advocated for the United States to send more military aid to Ukraine, especially ATACMS.

Immigration

McCaul supported President Donald Trump's proposals to build a wall along the Mexico–United States border. He supports the Remain in Mexico policy.

Committee assignments 
 Committee on Foreign Affairs (Chair)
 Committee on Homeland Security

Caucus memberships 
 Founder and co-chair of the Congressional High Tech Caucus 
 Co-founder and co-chair of the Childhood Cancer Caucus
 Co-chair of the Congressional Cyber Security Caucus
 Co-chair of the Congressional Caucus on Sudan and South Sudan
 Co-founder of the Congressional Argentina Caucus
 Tuberculosis Elimination Caucus
 United States Congressional International Conservation Caucus
Republican Governance Group
Republican Study Committee

Personal life
McCaul is married to Linda Mays McCaul, the daughter of Clear Channel Communications founder and former chairman Lowry Mays and sister of its former CEO Mark Mays. In 2011, Roll Call named McCaul as one of the wealthiest members of the United States Congress, surpassing then U.S. Senator John Kerry. His net worth was estimated at $294 million, about 300% higher than it was in the previous year ($74 million). In 2004, the same publication estimated his net worth at $12 million. His wealth increase was due to large monetary transfers from his wife's family.

McCaul and his family live in West Lake Hills, Texas, a wealthy suburb of Austin, Texas.

See also
 List of richest American politicians
 Final Report of the Task Force on Combating Terrorist and Foreign Fighter Travel

References

External links
 Congressman Michael McCaul official U.S. House website
 Michael McCaul for Congress
 
 
 

|-

|-

|-

1962 births
21st-century American politicians
American people of English descent
American people of German descent
American people of Irish descent
Jesuit College Preparatory School of Dallas alumni
Living people
People from Dallas
Republican Party members of the United States House of Representatives from Texas
St. Mary's University School of Law alumni
Texas lawyers
Trinity University (Texas) alumni
United States Deputy Attorneys General